Christian Heritage School is a private K-12 Christian school located in Dalton, Georgia, United States. The school was founded in 1986. As of 2019, the total student population was over 500.

Sports 
Most of Christian Heritage's sports programs are within the Georgia Independent School Association, and several of their sports teams, including those for softball, basketball, and soccer, have won state titles. The first state title won by the Lions basketball team was in 2005. They finished the season 33–5. The varsity football team won State in the Georgia Football League (GFC-GFL) in 2008.

Christian Heritage offers these sports to students:
 Soccer - varsity boys and girls
 Volleyball - middle school & varsity
 Football - middle school & varsity
 Basketball - middle school, JV, & varsity, boys and girls
 Cheerleading - middle school & varsity
 Baseball - middle school & varsity
 Softball - high school
 Tennis - middle school & varsity, girls and boys
 Golf - varsity
 Fishing - middle school & varsity
wrestling
cross country

References

External links
 
 Official Facebook page

1986 establishments in Georgia (U.S. state)
Christian schools in Georgia (U.S. state)
Educational institutions established in 1986
Schools in Whitfield County, Georgia
Dalton, Georgia
Private elementary schools in Georgia (U.S. state)
Private high schools in Georgia (U.S. state)
Private middle schools in Georgia (U.S. state)